Celiwe Thandazile Nkambule (born 19 February 1993) is a Swazi footballer who plays as a forward for Young Buffaloes FC and the Eswatini women's national team.

Club career
Nkambule has played for Young Buffaloes in Eswatini.

International career
Nkambule capped for Eswatini at senior level during two COSAFA Women's Championship editions (2020 and 2021).

References

1993 births
Living people
Swazi women's footballers
Women's association football forwards
Eswatini women's international footballers